Prastoka is a town and former Village Development Committee  in Bara District in the Narayani Zone of south-eastern Nepal. Now it has been subsumed in Prasauni Rural Municipality. At the time of the 1991 Nepal census it had a population of 6,222 persons living in 954 individual households.

References

External links
UN map of the municipalities of Bara District

Populated places in Bara District